Asa Walton House is a historic home located in East Fallowfield Township, Chester County, Pennsylvania. It was originally built about 1810 and rebuilt about 1900 in the Queen Anne style. It is a -story, seven bay, stuccoed stone dwelling with a slate covered multi-gabled roof.  It features a massive conical three-story turret and full width verandah with ornate balustrades and brackets.  It was renovated to its present form by the DeHaven Brothers, who also built the Harry DeHaven House and Isaac Pawling House.

It was added to the National Register of Historic Places in 1985.

References

Houses on the National Register of Historic Places in Pennsylvania
Queen Anne architecture in Pennsylvania
Houses completed in 1900
Houses in Chester County, Pennsylvania
National Register of Historic Places in Chester County, Pennsylvania